In Greek mythology, Leos (Ancient Greek: Λεώς) may refer to the following personages:

 Leos, one of the ten or twelve Eponyms of the Attic phylae whose statues were at the Athenian agora near the Tholos. He was the son of Orpheus and father of a son, Cylanthus, and of three daughters, Praxithea (or Phasithea, Phrasithea), Theope and Eubule. In obedience to the Delphian oracle he had his three daughters sacrificed in order to relieve the city of famine. A location in Attica and a hero-shrine was said to have received the name Leokorion after these daughters of Leos (Λεὡ κόραι, Leō korai) and Leokorion (Λεωκόριον). In reality though, the story of the daughters of Leos could have been invented to explain the placename.
 Leos, a native of Agnus, Attica, the herald of the sons of Pallas. He betrayed them by informing Theseus of their imminent attack, which let him strike at them while they were unaware and win. From that circumstance there was no intermarriage between the demes Agnus and Pallene, and the Pallenian heralds never used the formula "ἀκούετε λεῷ" ("Listen, people") because of the homophony of the word leōs "people" and Leos' name. The people of Agnus, on the contrary, sacrificed to Leos.

See also 

 Hyacinthus of Lacedaemon

Notes

References 

 Apollodorus, The Library with an English Translation by Sir James George Frazer, F.B.A., F.R.S. in 2 Volumes, Cambridge, MA, Harvard University Press; London, William Heinemann Ltd. 1921. ISBN 0-674-99135-4. Online version at the Perseus Digital Library. Greek text available from the same website.
 Claudius Aelianus, Varia Historia translated by Thomas Stanley (d.1700) edition of 1665. Online version at the Topos Text Project.
 Claudius Aelianus, Claudii Aeliani de natura animalium libri xvii, varia historia, epistolae, fragmenta, Vol 2. Rudolf Hercher. In Aedibus B.G. Teubneri. Lipsiae. 1866. Greek text available at the Perseus Digital Library. 
 Lucius Mestrius Plutarchus, Lives with an English Translation by Bernadotte Perrin. Cambridge, MA. Harvard University Press. London. William Heinemann Ltd. 1914. 1. Online version at the Perseus Digital Library. Greek text available from the same website.
 Marcus Tullius Cicero, Nature of the Gods from the Treatises of M.T. Cicero translated by Charles Duke Yonge (1812-1891), Bohn edition of 1878. Online version at the Topos Text Project.
Marcus Tullius Cicero, De Natura Deorum. O. Plasberg. Leipzig. Teubner. 1917.  Latin text available at the Perseus Digital Library.
Pausanias, Description of Greece with an English Translation by W.H.S. Jones, Litt.D., and H.A. Ormerod, M.A., in 4 Volumes. Cambridge, MA, Harvard University Press; London, William Heinemann Ltd. 1918. . Online version at the Perseus Digital Library
 Pausanias, Graeciae Descriptio. 3 vols. Leipzig, Teubner. 1903.  Greek text available at the Perseus Digital Library.
 Stephanus of Byzantium, Stephani Byzantii Ethnicorum quae supersunt, edited by August Meineike (1790-1870), published 1849. A few entries from this important ancient handbook of place names have been translated by Brady Kiesling. Online version at the Topos Text Project.
 Suida, Suda Encyclopedia translated by Ross Scaife, David Whitehead, William Hutton, Catharine Roth, Jennifer Benedict, Gregory Hays, Malcolm Heath Sean M. Redmond, Nicholas Fincher, Patrick Rourke, Elizabeth Vandiver, Raphael Finkel, Frederick Williams, Carl Widstrand, Robert Dyer, Joseph L. Rife, Oliver Phillips and many others. Online version at the Topos Text Project.

Greek mythological heroes
Attican characters in Greek mythology
Theseus

de:Leos